"Get Down" is the third and final single released from Nas' 2002 album God's Son. It features descriptive storytelling by Nas and funk-based production by Nas and Salaam Remi. In addition to elements of Funky Drummer, the track samples "The Boss" by James Brown which was previously made famous by the West Coast rapper Ice-T on his 1990 single "You Played Yourself"; the same sample was used in Poor Righteous Teachers' song "Word from the Wise" and Lord Finesse's "Bad Mutha". It was not as popular as Nas' previous two singles from God's Son, but still reached #76 on the Hot R&B/Hip-Hop Singles & Tracks chart.

Track listing

A-side
 "Get Down" (Clean Version) (4:04)
 "Get Down" (Instrumental) (4:04)
 "Get Down" (Acappella) (3:50)

B-side
 "Get Down" (Explicit Version) (4:04)
 "Last Real Nigga Alive" (Clean) (5:04)
 "Last Real Nigga Alive" (Explicit Version) (5:04)

Charts

References

2003 singles
Nas songs
Songs written by Salaam Remi
Song recordings produced by Salaam Remi
Songs written by Nas
Songs written by James Brown
Songs written by Fred Wesley
2003 songs